Haltern am See station is a station in the town of Haltern am See in the German state of North Rhine-Westphalia on  Wanne-Eickel–Hamburg railway from Wanne-Eickel to Hamburg. It is the northern terminus of Rhine-Ruhr S-Bahn line S 9.

It was opened in 1870. It is served by the Rhein-Haard-Express (RE 2), the Niers-Haard-Express (RE 42) and S-Bahn line S 9, each hourly.

Passengers with reduced mobility, strollers or heavy luggage should take note that the station does not have any elevators. With many trains arriving at platform 2, this means going down 20 steps, crossing and then ascending 20 steps.

References

Railway stations in North Rhine-Westphalia
Rhine-Ruhr S-Bahn stations
S9 (Rhine-Ruhr S-Bahn)
Railway stations in Germany opened in 1870
Buildings and structures in Recklinghausen (district)